Jamshedpur Lok Sabha constituency is one of the 14 Lok Sabha (parliamentary)  constituencies in Jharkhand state in eastern India. This constituency covers the entire East Singhbhum district.

Assembly segments
Presently, Jamshedpur Lok Sabha constituency comprises the following six Vidhan Sabha (legislative assembly) segments:

Members of Parliament

Election results

17th Lok Sabha: 2019 General Elections

See also
 East Singhbhum district
 List of Constituencies of the Lok Sabha

Notes

External links
Jamshed pur lok sabha  constituency election 2019 result details

Lok Sabha constituencies in Jharkhand
East Singhbhum district
Jamshedpur